The Roman Catholic Diocese of San Cristóbal de Las Casas (erected 19 March 1539 as the Diocese of Chiapas, renamed 27 October 1964) is a suffragan diocese of the Archdiocese of Tuxtla. Its see is in San Cristóbal de las Casas in Chiapas. In November 2017 Rodrigo Aguilar Martínez was appointed new bishop on the resignation of Bishop Felipe Arizmendi Esquivel.

Bishops

Ordinaries

Diocese of Chiapas
Erected: 19 March 1539

Diocese of San Cristóbal de Las Casas
Name Changed: 27 October 1964
Samuel Ruiz García (27 Oct 1964 - 13 Mar 2000, retired)
Felipe Arizmendi Esquivel (31 Mar 2000 - 3 November 2017, resigned)
Rodrigo Aguilar Martínez (3 November 2017 – present)

Coadjutor bishop
José Raúl Vera López, O.P. (1995-1999); did not succeed to see; appointed Bishop of Saltillo, Coahuila
Enrique Díaz Díaz (2014-2017); did not succeed the see; appointed Bishop of Irapuato

Auxiliary bishop
Enrique Díaz Díaz (2003-2014), appointed Coadjutor here
 Luis Manuel López Alfaro (2020-)

References

 
 

San Cristobal de Las Casas
1539 establishments in New Spain
San Cristobal de Las Casas
San Cristobal de Las Casas
San Cristobal de Las Casas, Roman Catholic Diocese of
San Cristóbal de las Casas